Igors Anatolyevich Bondarevs (born February 9, 1974, in Riga, Soviet Union) is a Latvian professional former ice hockey player.

He represented Latvia at four IIHF World Championships and the 2002 Winter Olympics.

Career statistics

Regular season and playoffs

International

References

External links
 
 
 
 

1974 births
Living people
AaB Ishockey players
ASK/Ogre players
Birmingham Bulls (ECHL) players
Colorado Eagles players
Dallas Freeze players
Fort Worth Fire players
HC Slovan Bratislava players
HK Riga 2000 players
Huntsville Channel Cats (SHL) players
Huntsville Channel Cats (CHL) players
Huntsville Tornado players
Ice hockey players at the 2002 Winter Olympics
Jokipojat players
MKS Cracovia (ice hockey) players
Las Vegas Thunder players
Latvian ice hockey defencemen
Olympic ice hockey players of Latvia
Oulun Kärpät players
SaiPa players
Ice hockey people from Riga
Torpedo Nizhny Novgorod players
Yunost Minsk players
San Jose Rhinos players
Soviet ice hockey defencemen
Latvian expatriate sportspeople in Russia
Latvian expatriate sportspeople in the United States
Latvian expatriate sportspeople in Belarus
Latvian expatriate sportspeople in Denmark
Latvian expatriate sportspeople in Slovakia
Latvian expatriate sportspeople in Poland
Latvian expatriate sportspeople in Finland
Expatriate ice hockey players in Russia
Expatriate ice hockey players in the United States
Expatriate ice hockey players in Belarus
Expatriate ice hockey players in Denmark
Expatriate ice hockey players in Slovakia
Expatriate ice hockey players in Poland
Expatriate ice hockey players in Finland
Latvian expatriate ice hockey people